Lynnwood is a suburb of the city of Pretoria, South Africa. It is a well-developed area, lying to the east of the city centre.

When it was first established in the 1960s, it was the most eastern suburb of Pretoria, but the city has since considerably expanded eastwards and southwards.

Together with Brooklyn and Menlo Park, it was most likely named after American counterparts.  Today these suburbs are known as the old east and boast to have some of the city's most high-end residential properties.

References

Suburbs of Pretoria